American singer Alicia Keys has released nine studio albums, two live albums, one remix album, four reissue albums, one extended play, seven box sets, 46 singles as lead artist, and six promotional singles. Throughout her career, Keys has sold over 65 million records worldwide. According to Recording Industry Association of America, Keys is the top certified female R&B artist of the millennium, with 20 million certified albums and 38 million certified digital singles in the United States. Billboard ranked her as the second top female artist of the 2000s decade (5th overall), fourth top R&B/hip-Hop female artist of the 2010s decade (26th overall) and the 60th Greatest Artist of all time.

Keys' debut album Songs in A Minor (2001) debuted at number one on the US Billboard 200 and produced the singles "Fallin'", "A Woman's Worth", "How Come You Don't Call Me" and "Girlfriend," the former of which peaked at number one on the US Billboard Hot 100. Songs in A Minor went on to sell over 12 million copies worldwide and made Keys the best-selling new artist and best-selling R&B artist of 2001. Her second studio album, The Diary of Alicia Keys, was released in December 2003 and sold eight million copies worldwide. It became Keys' second consecutive number-one US debut, selling over 618,000 copies its first week of release, becoming the largest first-week sales for a female artist in 2003. Four singles were released from the album, three of which became top-ten singles, including "You Don't Know My Name" and "If I Ain't Got You", the latter of which became the first single by a female artist to remain on the Billboard Hot R&B/Hip-Hop Songs chart for over a year.

In 2005, Keys released her first live album, Unplugged, which again debuted at number one in the United States. She became the first female to have an MTV Unplugged album to debut at number one and the highest since Nirvana in 1994. In 2007, "No One", the lead single from Keys's third studio album, As I Am, was released. Her biggest commercial success since "Fallin'", it remained at the top of the Billboard Hot 100 for five consecutive weeks and became the song most listened to of 2007 in the United States. Selling 742,000 copies in its first week, As I Am gained Keys the largest first week sales of her career and became her fourth consecutive number one album. The album sold five million copies worldwide.

Keys's fourth album The Element of Freedom (2009) became her first non-number one album in the United States and her first number one album in the United Kingdom. The album was certified platinum by the RIAA within its first month of release and produced five singles that attained chart success, including "Doesn't Mean Anything" and "Un-Thinkable (I'm Ready)". Keys's fifth studio album Girl on Fire (2012) sold 159,000 copies in its first week of release in the United States and marked her lowest opening sales for an album. The lead single was the title track, which reached the top ten in several countries worldwide. On November 4, 2016, she released her sixth album Here.

Albums

Studio albums

Live albums

Reissue albums

Box sets

Remix albums

Extended plays

Singles

As lead artist

As featured artist

Promotional singles

Other charted songs

Guest appearances

Production discography

Soundtrack appearances

See also
 Alicia Keys videography
 List of songs written by Alicia Keys

Notes

References

External links
 

Discography
Discographies of American artists
Rhythm and blues discographies
Soul music discographies